Oktyabrsky District is an administrative and municipal district (raion), one of the five in the Jewish Autonomous Oblast, Russia. It is located in the west and southwest of the autonomous oblast. Its administrative center is the rural locality (a selo) of Amurzet. Population: 11,354 (2010 Census);  The population of Amurzet accounts for 44.5% of the district's total population.

References

Notes

Sources

Districts of Jewish Autonomous Oblast